The Assistant Secretary of the Navy (Energy, Installations and Environment) (abbreviated ASN(EI&E)) is a civilian office in the United States Navy established in 1990.  The Assistant Secretary of the Navy (Energy, Installations and Environment) reports to the Under Secretary of the Navy, who in turn reports to the United States Secretary of the Navy.

The Assistant Secretary of the Navy (Energy, Installations and Environment) is responsible for greater energy security, acquiring and disposing of the Navy's real property; constructing and maintaining all US naval installations; overseeing occupational health and safety issues for all Navy personnel (military and civilian); overseeing the Navy's environmental protection, planning, and restoration efforts; and overseeing the Navy's efforts to conserve cultural and natural resources.

List of Deputy Assistant Secretaries Reporting to the Assistant Secretary of the Navy (Energy, Installations and Environment)

 Principal Deputy Assistant Secretary of the Navy (Energy, Installations and Environment) – PDASN (EI&E)   
 Deputy Assistant Secretary of the Navy (Installations, Energy & Facilities) – DASN (IE&F)
 Deputy Assistant Secretary of the Navy (Environment) – DASN (E)
 Deputy Assistant Secretary of the Navy (Safety) – DASN (Safety)
 Assistant General Counsel of the Navy (Energy, Installations and Environment) – AGC (EI&E)
 Executive Director, Public Private Partnership Reviews

Assistant Secretaries of the Navy (Energy, Installations & Environment), 1990—present

References

 Page at US Navy Library
 Records at the Naval Historical Center

Office of the Secretary of the Navy